The 2014 Algerian Cup Final was the 50th final of the Algerian Cup. The final took place on May 1, 2014, at stade Mustapha Tchaker in Blida with kick-off at 16:00. MC Alger beat JS Kabylie 5–4 on penalties, to win their seventh Algerian Cup.

Algerian Ligue Professionnelle 1 clubs MC Alger and JS Kabylie will contest the final, in what will be the 100th edition of the Algerien Classico. The competition winners are awarded a berth in the 2015 CAF Confederation Cup.

Pre-match
MC Alger were appearing in an Algerian Cup final for an eighth time. They had won the cup six times previously (in 1971, 1973, 1976, 1983, 2006, 2007) and had lost in the last final 2013, JS Kabylie were appearing in a final a tenth time and had won the cup Five times previously (in 1977, 1986, 1992, 1994, 2011).

Details

References

Cup
Algerian Cup Finals